Robin Francis Budenberg CBE (born 1959) is a British Corporate Adviser. He was appointed  non-executive Director of Lloyds Banking Group on 1 October 2020 and became Chairman on 4 January 2021 and was appointed Chairman of The Crown Estate on 9 August 2016.

Early life
Budenberg grew up in Cheshire, where his family owned Budenberg Gauge Company, a maker of pressure gauges and accessories established in Manchester in 1854.  Budenberg holds a Bachelor of Law degree from the University of Exeter.

Career
Budenberg started his career with Price Waterhouse where he qualified  as a Chartered Accountant and joined SG Warburg in 1984. He was a senior investment banker at UBS Investment Bank where he worked for over 25 years and oversaw the bank's relationship with HM Treasury. He was part of the team that designed the Government Bank Recapitalisation
Scheme in October 2008.

From 2010 until January 2014, he was Chief Executive and then Chairman of UK Financial Investments, the UK government body that oversees the government's investments in financial institutions bailed out during the banking crisis.  Budenberg was London Chairman of Centerview Partners between 2015 and 2020 and was also a non executive director of Charity Bank and Big Society Trust

Honours
In 2015, he was appointed CBE "For services to the taxpayers and the economy".

Personal life
Married with four children, Budenberg enjoys golf

References 

Living people
1959 births
Commanders of the Order of the British Empire
Alumni of the University of Exeter
British bankers
British accountants
British chairpersons of corporations
People from Cheshire